The discography of Robbie Williams, an English singer-songwriter, consists of twelve studio albums, one live album, ten compilation albums, one extended play, ten video albums, fifty-nine singles (including six as a featured artist), six promotional singles and fifty-six music videos (including two as a featured artist). Williams originally found success in the male pop group Take That, which he joined in 1990 following a successful audition: they released a series of UK number-one singles, including "Pray", "Relight My Fire", "Babe" and "Back for Good". Williams left Take That in 1995 to pursue a solo career; the group disbanded the following year.

His first single, a cover of English singer George Michael's "Freedom", reached number two on the UK Singles Chart in 1996. Life thru a Lens, Williams' debut studio album, was released the following year. Although the album initially sold poorly, strong radio play of its fourth single, "Angels", helped to increase sales of Life thru a Lens, leading to it topping the UK Albums Chart and later being certified eight times platinum by the British Phonographic Industry (BPI). Although it only reached number four in the United Kingdom, consistent sales eventually led "Angels" to be certified double platinum by the BPI; the single also reached the top ten of the French, German and Swiss singles charts.

Williams released his second album, I've Been Expecting You, in October 1998. It too topped the UK Albums Chart and experienced reasonable international success, reaching the top twenty of several worldwide charts. Two of the album's singles, "Millennium" and the double A-side "She's the One" / "It's Only Us", became Williams' first singles as a solo artist to top the UK Singles Chart. Sing When You're Winning followed in August 2000, and became his first to achieve significant overseas commercial success, topping many national album charts and including the UK number-ones "Rock DJ" and "Eternity" / "The Road to Mandalay". A collection of covers of popular swing songs, entitled Swing When You're Winning, was released in November 2001 and his cover of the Carson Parks song "Somethin' Stupid" with actress Nicole Kidman became his most successful single to date, reaching the top three of many singles charts and peaking at number one in the United Kingdom and New Zealand. During 2002, Williams collaborated with concept band 1 Giant Leap on their single "My Culture", which reached number nine in the UK. His next two albums, Escapology (2002) and Intensive Care (2005), maintained this success, both topping the UK Albums Chart, and contained the international top-five hits "Feel" and "Tripping". Williams released his first live album, Live at Knebworth, in 2003 and his first greatest hits album, Greatest Hits, in 2004, with the latter certified six times platinum by the BPI and eight times platinum by the Australian Recording Industry Association (ARIA).

Following a deliberate break from media scrutiny, Williams released his seventh album Rudebox in October 2006 to great public anticipation. Despite a lukewarm critical reception, it matched the chart success of its predecessors, becoming Williams' seventh album in a row to reach number one in the United Kingdom and spawning the UK number-four single of the same name.

His eighth album, Reality Killed the Video Star, followed in November 2009, but became his first studio album not to reach number one on the UK Albums Chart, charting at number two. The single "Bodies" reached number two in the UK and topped several European singles charts. Another retrospective compilation album, In and Out of Consciousness: Greatest Hits 1990–2010 was released in 2010, reaching number one in the UK: during the year, Williams also returned to Take That, who had reformed in 2006 without him. Take the Crown, Williams' ninth studio album, was released in November 2012 and featured the UK number-one single "Candy"; his tenth studio album, Swings Both Ways, was released the following year and became the one thousandth album to top the UK Albums Chart.

As of 2020, Williams has had 14 UK number-one singles (seven solo and seven with Take That; not including being part of four number-one charity singles).

Albums

Studio albums

Live albums

Compilation albums

Extended plays

Singles

As lead artist

As featured artist

Promotional singles

Other charted songs

Guest appearances

As Lufthaus

See also
 Take That discography

Notes

References

External links
 Official website
 Robbie Williams at AllMusic
 
 

Discographies of British artists
Pop music discographies
Discography